is a Japanese investment bank that is the second largest securities brokerage after Nomura Securities.

Major subsidiaries include Daiwa Securities, which offers retail services such as online trading to individual investors and investment banking services in Japan, as well as Daiwa Capital Markets, the firm's international investment banking arm (with a presence across Asia, Europe and North America) that provides M&A advisory, sales and trading services in a variety of financial products to corporate and institutional clients. Other group companies provide asset management, research and private equity fund services.

The company is the fourth largest shareholder in SL Green Realty.

History

Daiwa Securities SB Capital Markets
The company was founded in 1999 as Daiwa Securities SB Capital Markets Co. Ltd., a joint venture between Daiwa Securities Group (Daiwa) and Sumitomo Bank (SB). It was renamed in 2001 to Daiwa Securities SMBC Co. Ltd., after Sumitomo Bank merged with Sakura Bank on 1 April 2001 to form Sumitomo Mitsui Banking Corporation (SMBC), a wholly owned subsidiary of Sumitomo Mitsui Financial Group (SMFG). However, in 2010, SMBC acquired Nikko Cordial (Japan's third largest brokerage at that time).

Daiwa Securities Capital Markets Company
Following this step, Daiwa dissolved the joint-venture with SMBC and re-acquired 100% of the shares in the company, before renaming it again as Daiwa Securities Capital Markets Co. Ltd. Finally, about two years later, the company was absorbed in a merger leaving Daiwa Securities Co. Ltd as the sole entity.

Member companies
 Daiwa Financial Holdings Co., Ltd.
 Daiwa Securities Co., Ltd.
 Daiwa Asset Management Co., Ltd.
 Daiwa Institute of Research Ltd.
 Daiwa SB Investments Ltd.
 Daiwa Securities Business Center Co., Ltd.
 The Daiwa Property Co. Ltd.
 Daiwa Capital Markets America Inc.
 Daiwa Capital Markets Europe Ltd.

Projects
In July 2012, Daiwa Securities Group was chosen by the Central Bank of Myanmar to spearhead a $380-million project designed to develop an IT network for the Myanmar government that would connect all ministries as well as schools and hospitals to a cloud computing system and would also entail a secure online banking system for the country.

See also
Daiwa Anglo-Japanese Foundation

References

External links

  
 Fundinguniverse.com Company History
  Wiki collection of bibliographic works on Daiwa Securities Group

 
Financial services companies based in Tokyo
Primary dealers
Financial services companies established in 1943
Banks established in 1943
Companies listed on the Tokyo Stock Exchange
Japanese companies established in 1943